The An Post Museum or GPO Museum was located in the General Post Office in Dublin, Ireland opened on 28 July 2010. It closed on 30 May 2015 to make way for the new GPO: Witness History Interpretive Centre. It was a small museum which offered visitors an insight into the role played by the Post Office in the development of Irish society over many generations. The An Post Museum & Archive continues to hold the Post Office's heritage and philatelic collections, mount  occasional temporary displays of its material and publish research on aspects of Irish Post Office history. 

As well as Irish stamps and philatelic information and a scale model of the GPO, there were several audio visual presentations, An Post's copy of the 1916 Proclamation and a Pepper's ghost dramatisation about the role of the staff who were actually on duty in the GPO on Easter Monday 1916.

Much of the information and audio visual material contained in the museum continues to be available on the website. The physical museum will be replaced by a new Interpretive Centre housing a permanent exhibition marking the centenary of the 1916 Easter Rising, and it will focus on a theme of the GPO as ‘Witness to History’.

Sections
The An Post Museum was divided into three sections: Art of the Stamp, Post Office in Ireland, and Easter 1916.

Art of the Stamp

The Art of the Stamp section offered visitors the opportunity to view Ireland's stamps from the turn of the Free State right up to the present day, by using an interactive stamps database. In this section of the museum there was also a stamp design tool to teach about how stamps are made using digital formats. There were examples of stamp printing plates used to make Ireland's first definitive stamps.

Post Office in Ireland

This section offered visitors the chance to hear the stories of retired post office staff members by the means of a modified switchboard. Visitors could listen to the experiences from different departments within the Irish Post Office when it was known as the Post and Telegraphs (P&T).

There were a number of short visual documentaries detailing the foundation of the Irish Post Office which track its movement from Dublin Castle to its current site O'Connell Street. Visitors could learn how the methods of delivering mails changed with improvements in technology.

Easter 1916

This area displayed a copy of the Proclamation of Ireland that was read aloud by Padraig Pearse from the front of the GPO on Easter Monday, 24 April 1916.  The design surrounding the Proclamation covered different pictorial views of the damaged GPO after the rebels surrendered to the British Army. There was a holographic (Pepper's ghost) re-enactment of events that took place in the Telegraph Room when the rebels took over the communications room. The film is based on eyewitness accounts taken from the staff members involved.

Closure
The museum closed on 30 May 2015 though some of its material is available online. This was replaced with a new €7 million visitor centre GPO Witness History, that opened on 29 March 2016 to commemorate the Easter Rising in 1916 where the General Post Office was a central feature.

References

External links
 An Post Museum, GPO
 Visit Dublin: An Post Museum
 GPO Witness History

History museums in the Republic of Ireland
Museums in Dublin (city)
Defunct museums
Postal museums
Museums established in 2010
Museums disestablished in 2015
2015 disestablishments in Ireland
2010 establishments in Ireland